Arkle Town is a hamlet in Arkengarthdale in the Richmondshire district of North Yorkshire, England.

History 
"Arkel" is a Norse personal name and probably arrived with settlers during the tenth century. Formerly it had a parish church, inn and workhouse, the only evidence of these buildings that remains is a small number of gravestones at the site of the former St. Mary's Church, which was relocated further up the dale in 1816. 
The 1851 census counted 41 houses in Arkle Town.

Governance 
The hamlet is within the Richmond (Yorks) parliamentary constituency, which is under the control of the Conservative Party. The current Member of Parliament, since the 2015 general election, is Rishi Sunak.

Arkle Town also falls within the Lower Swaledale and Arkengarthdale ward of Richmondshire District Council and the Upper Dales Electoral Division of North Yorkshire County Council.

References

External links

Arkengarthdale
Hamlets in North Yorkshire